"Resistiré México" is a song and charity single recorded by the supergroup Artists for Mexico in 2020. It is a remake of the 1988 hit song "Resistiré", which was written and performed by Dúo Dinámico. In May 2020, it was confirmed that all revenue from "Resistiré México" would go to COVID-19 pandemic in Mexico.

Background 
During the quarantine due to the COVID-19 pandemic, a new version was recorded featuring many well-known Mexican singers. The project is led by Warner Music Mexico with the assistance of other record companies like OCESA Seitrack, Sony Music Mexico and Universal Music Mexico. The song was be launched commercially on April 16, 2020. "Resistiré México" was written by Carlos Toro Montoro and Manuel de la Calva and produced by Armando Ávila.

In May 2020, it was confirmed that all revenue from "Resistiré México" would go towards the Temporary Unit COVID-19, installed in the Citibanamex Center.

Music video 
The music video was released on April 16, 2020 on the Warner Music Mexico's YouTube and the other video channels.

Artists for Mexico musicians 

 Aida Cuevas
 Arath Herce
 Axel Muñiz
 Benny Ibarra
 Belinda
 Camila
 Caztro
 Chucho Rivas
 Cristian Castro
 DLD
 Edith Márquez
 Gloria Trevi
 Ha*Ash
 Horacio Palencia
 Kaia Lana
 Kinky
 Leonel Garcia
 Lila Downs
 Lupe Esparza
 María José
 María León
 MC Davo
 Mijares
 Mœnia
 Paty Cantú
 Río Roma 
 Rodrigo Davila 
 Sandra Echeverria
 Ximena Sariñana
 Yahir

Charts

Release history

See also 

 Resistiré (Dúo Dinámico song)

References

External links

2020 singles
COVID-19 pandemic in Mexico
All-star recordings
Charity singles
Pop ballads
2020 songs